Nozomi Sakurai may refer to:

Nozomi Sakurai, a character from Kamisama Minarai: Himitsu no Cocotama.
Nozomi Sakurai, a character from Princess Connect! Re:Dive.